The Brazilian slender opossum (Marmosops paulensis) is an opossum species from South America. It is found in moist montane forest in the Atlantic Forest region of southeastern Brazil, including the states of Minas Gerais, Rio de Janeiro, São Paulo and Paraná. Its breeding may be fully semelparous, which is unusual for a mammal.

It is considered monotypic and analysis of mtDNA sequences has distinguished this species from other Marmosops. Similar to the gray slender opossum (M. Incanus), adults of this species have short fur while young have long, soft fur. Early research identified M. paulensis as a subspecies of M. incana. The name M paulensis came from a mistaken attribution of the species origin as São Paulo. Subsequent research has, however, distinguished M. paulensis based on various features like smaller upper canines, absence of palatine fenestrae and longer incisive foramina.

References

Opossums
Endemic fauna of Brazil
Fauna of the Atlantic Forest
Marsupials of South America
Mammals of Brazil
Environment of Rio de Janeiro (state)
Environment of São Paulo (state)
Mammals described in 1931